The 1957 Ballon d'Or, given to the best football player in Europe as judged by a panel of sports journalists from UEFA member countries, was awarded to Alfredo Di Stefano on 17 December 1957.

Rankings

Notes

References

External links
 France Football Official Ballon d'Or page

1957
1956–57 in European football